Monoprista nudobia is a moth in the family Drepanidae and the only species in the genus Monoprista. It was described by Swinhoe in 1894. It is found in India.

Adults are olive-brown with two black spots at the end of each cell. The forewings have two brown indistinct bands, one from the base subcostal, the other from the middle of the hindmargin to the apex. The hindwings have a central brown band, limited inwardly by a brown line, above which is a broad ochreous band.

References

Moths described in 1894
Drepaninae
Monotypic moth genera
Drepanidae genera